This List of echinoderm orders concerns the various classes and orders into which taxonomists categorize the roughly 7000 extant species as well as the extinct species of the exclusively marine phylum Echinodermata.

Subphylum Crinozoa

Class Crinoidea 

 Subclass Articulata (540 species)
 Order Bourgueticrinida
 Order Comatulida
 Order Cyrtocrinida
 Order Hyocrinida
 Order Isocrinida
 Order Millericrinida
 Subclass †Flexibilia
 Subclass †Camerata
 Subclass †Disparida

Class Paracrinoidea † 
No orders, 13 to 15 genera are known.

 order Comarocystitida †
 ?Family Heckeritidae †
 Heckerites †
 Family Amygdalocystitidae †
 Achradocystites † Volborth, 1870
 Amygdalocystites † Billings, 1854 (= Ottawacystis) (?= Billingsocystis)
 Oklahomacystis † Parsley & Mintz, 1975 (Bassler, 1943)
 Ovulocystites † Frest et al., 1980
 Family Comarocystitidae † Balther, 1899
 Comarocystites † Billings, 1854
 Implicaticystis †
 Sinclairocystis †
 order Platycystitida †
 Family Platycystitidae †
 Canadocystis † (= Sigmacystis)
 Platycystites †
 Family Malocystitidae †
 Malocystites †
 Wellerocystis †
 Family Bistomiacystitidae †
 Bistomiacystis †

Doubtful paracrinoids:
 Columbocystis
 Foerstecystis
 Springerocystis
 Ulrichocystis
 Paleocystites
 Allocystites

Class Cystoidea † 
 order Aristocystitida †
 order Asteroblastida †
 order Glyptosphaeritida †
 order Sphaeronitida †

Class Edrioasteroidea † 

 order Edrioasterida
 order Isorophida

Subphylum Asterozoa

Class Ophiuroidea (Brittle stars) 

 Order Euryalida
 Order Ophiurida
 Order Amphilepidida
 Order Ophiacanthida
 Order Ophioleucida
 Order Ophioscolecida

Class Asteroidea (Starfish) 
Infraclass Concentricycloidea
Peripodida
Superorder Forcipulatacea
Brisingida
Forcipulatida
Superorder Spinulosacea
Spinulosida
Superorder Valvatacea
Notomyotida
Paxillosida
Valvatida
Velatida
 † Calliasterellidae 
 † Trichasteropsida

Subphylum Echinozoa

Class Echinoidea (Sea urchins) 

 Order Diadematoida
 Order Echinothurioida
 Order Pedinoida
 Superorder Echinacea
 Order Arbacioida
 Order Echinoida
 Order Phymosomatoida
 Order Salenioida
 Order Temnopleuroida
 Superorder Gnathostomata
 Order Clypeasteroida (sand dollars)
 Order Holectypoida
 Superorder Atelostomata
 Order Holasteroida
 Order Spatangoida (heart urchins)

Class Holothuroidea (Sea cucumbers) 

 Order Apodida 
 Order Dendrochirotida 
 Order Elasipodida 
 Order Holothuriida
 Order Molpadida
 Order Persiculida
 Order Synallactida

Class Ophiocistioidea † 

No orders recognized: class is divided up into four families, Eucladiidae, Sollasiniidae, Volchoviidae, and Rhenosquamidae.  The inclusion of Rhenosquamidae within Ophiocistioidea is doubtful, as the organs identified in fossils of Rhenosquamus as the characteristic "scaly podia" otherwise diagnostic of ophiocistioids may not, in fact, be such structures.

Class Helicoplacoidea † 
No known orders, 2 known species, Helicoplacus curtisi and H. guthi

Subphylum Blastozoa

Class Blastoidea † 

 Ordre Coronata †
 Order Fissiculata †
 Order Spiraculata †
 basal Macurdablastus †

Class Eocrinoidea † 

 Order Ascocystida †
 Order Gogiida †
 Order Imbricata †
 Order Trachelocrinida †

Subphylum Homostelea / Homalozoa †

Class Ctenocystoidea † 
 order Ctenocystida †

Class Soluta †

Class Cincta †

Class Stylophora † 
 order Cornuta † 
 order Mitrata †

References

 List
Orders